Nagia gravipes is a species of moth in the family Erebidae. It is found in Sierra Leone and South Africa.

References

Nagia
Moths described in 1858
Moths of Africa